Tsokkos Hotels (CY: TSH) is a hotel chain owned by the Tsokkos family. The business was founded in 1979 by the Andreas Tsokkos.  The company is Cyprus's largest hotel chain with over 8,000 rooms in 30 hotels in Cyprus and Egypt.  It has 1,200 employees and serves 1.2 million clients per year. There are Tsokkos Hotels in Cyprus and Egypt.

Hotels and resorts

Cyprus
Protaras

 Tsokkos Constantinos The Great Beach Hotel
 Tsokkos Vrissiana Beach Hotel
 Tsokkos Iliada Beach Hotel
 Tsokkos Odessa Hotel
 Tsokkos Beach Hotel
 Tsokkos Anastasia Hotel
 Tsokkos Gardens Hotel
 Tsokkos Polycarpia Hotel
 Tsokkos Silver Sands Beach Hotel
 Tsokkos Antigoni Hotel
 Tsokkos Gardens Hotel Apts A'
 Tsokkos Sun Gardens Hotel Apts A'
 Tsokkos Vryssi Hotel Apts A'
 Tsokkos Marlita Beach Hotel Apts A'
 Tsokkos Ausonia Hotel Apts A'
 Tsokkos Papantonia Hotel Apts A'
 Tsokkos Tropical Dreams Hotel Apts A'
 Tsokkos Pambero Hotel Apts A'
 Tsokkos Anastasia Beach Hotel Apts A'
 Tsokkos Flora Hotel Apts A'

Ayia Napa

 Tsokkos Dome Beach Hotel
 Tsokkos Anmaria Beach Hotel
 Tsokkos Napa Hotel
 Tsokkos Paradise Village
 Tsokkos Evabelle Napa Hotel Apts A'
 Tsokkos Holiday Hotel Apts A'
 Tsokkos Holiday Hotel Apts B'
 Tsokkos Maria Apts

Paphos

 Tsokkos Ascos Coral Beach Hotel
 Tsokkos King Evelthon

Egypt
Sharm el-Sheikh

 Tsokkos Cleopatra Hotel

References

External links 
 Official Tsokkos Hotels Website

Hotel chains in Cyprus